This is a list of seasons completed by the Massachusetts Marauders. The Marauders were a professional arena football franchise of the Arena Football League (AFL), based in Worcester, Massachusetts. The team was established in 1988 as the Detroit Drive. The franchise appeared in the ArenaBowl in every season in which they were located in Detroit, winning ArenaBowl II, ArenaBowl III, ArenaBowl IV, and ArenaBowl VI. Though the franchise was a consistent championship contender, then-owner Mike Ilitch sold the Drive after purchasing the Detroit Tigers of Major League Baseball. The new owner then moved the team to Massachusetts for the 1994 season, where they changed their name to the Marauders. After an altercation between the new owner and the commissioner of the AFL, the team folded. Almost three years later, Dan DeVos, son of Amway co-founder and current owner of the NBA's Orlando Magic, Richard DeVos, bought the franchise out of bankruptcy court. The franchise would play in the 1998 season, but as the Grand Rapids Rampage, however the Rampage do not retain the history and records of the Detroit/Massachusetts era. While in Detroit, the Drive played at Joe Louis Arena, and at Worcester Centrum for their single season in Massachusetts.

References
General
 
 

Arena Football League seasons by team
Massachusetts Marauders
Detroit-related lists
Michigan sports-related lists
Massachusetts sports-related lists